Glyceria nemoralis is a species of grass in the family Poaceae.

Its native range is Eastern Central and Eastern Europe to Caucasus.

References

nemoralis